Exodus Isaac Geohaghon (born 27 February 1985) is an English former footballer.

Spending some time in his youth with West Bromwich Albion, he played for Sutton Coldfield Town between 2000 and 2005. After a season with Bromsgrove Rovers and two with Redditch United, he then signed with Kettering Town. In 2010, he moved up to the English Football League, moving to Peterborough United after a loan spell. Whilst at Peterborough, he was loaned out to Rotherham United, Shrewsbury Town, and Port Vale. He joined Barnet in August 2011, before he signed with Darlington two months later. He joined Dagenham & Redbridge on loan in November 2011, before joining Mansfield Town on loan in February 2012. He signed with Kidderminster Harriers in July 2012, before making a permanent return to Mansfield less than two months later. He won the Conference Premier title with Mansfield in 2012–13. He spent time with Worcester City in 2013, before ending up at Braintree Town. He joined Solihull Moors in January 2014, before penning a deal at Nuneaton Town in August 2014. Later in 2014-15, he played for Whitehawk and Stourbridge. He joined Torquay United in July 2015. He returned to Nuneaton Town as a player-coach in November 2016, and later had brief spells at Stafford Rangers, Halesowen Town, Barwell, Highgate United, and Gresley.

Club career

Early career
As a youngster, Geohaghon played for West Bromwich Albion. He moved to Sutton Coldfield Town in 2000, before joining Southern Football League side Bromsgrove Rovers in 2005 for an undisclosed fee. He left the club the following summer, and joined Conference North club Redditch United on trial in July 2006, before joining permanently a month later. During two seasons with Redditch, he made 71 league appearances, helping the club to avoid relegation. He was also in attendance at the University of Wolverhampton during his time at Redditch – studying Video and Film Production, he graduated in summer 2008.

Kettering Town
Geohaghon joined Conference Premier team Kettering Town for an undisclosed five-figure fee on 7 August 2008, after initially joining on a month's loan. He soon became first choice centre-back in the team's defence alongside Guy Branston in the 2008–09 season. Geohaghon's goal at Rockingham Road in the First Round of the 2008–09 FA Cup was picked out by Robbie Earle on the ITV "FA Cup Highlights" programme as one of the highlights of the round, as Kettering held League Two club Lincoln City to a 1–1 draw on 8 November 2008. Later that month it was reported that Championship sides Crystal Palace, Sheffield United, and Plymouth Argyle were interested in signing Geohaghon in the 2009 January transfer window. Kettering manager Mark Cooper stated that it would take a "stupid" offer to allow the defender to leave the club.

Peterborough United
In November 2009, he rejoined his former manager Mark Cooper at Championship side Peterborough United, in a loan deal that would become permanent in January 2010. He was made man of the match on his debut, in a 2–2 draw with Middlesbrough. Geohaghon scored his first goal for Peterborough on 19 December 2009, netting the winner in a 2–1 victory over Watford. His position changed with the arrival of Jim Gannon as manager, and this resulted in "improved and more composed performances" from Geohaghon. Under new manager Gary Johnson he was transfer-listed at the end of the 2009–10 season, just four months into his three-and-a-half-year contract.

He joined Rotherham United on a one-month loan deal for August 2010. The loan was extended to three months after he became a key part of Ronnie Moore's back four. In November of that year Geohaghon joined Shrewsbury Town on loan until January, initially to help solve injury troubles to the team's key defenders Ian Sharps and David Raven. The deal was made just hours before kick-off against local rivals Crewe Alexandra. His loan spell ended prematurely, as after only three starts he picked up a knee injury that kept him in the treatment room for two months. In January 2011, Jim Gannon was appointed as Port Vale manager, and he immediately brought Geohaghon to Vale Park on loan until the end of the season. Over the course of just four victories in twelve consecutive games with Geohaghon as a holding midfielder, both he and Gannon became highly unpopular figures with some sections of the Vale support. This culminated in ugly scenes on 19 March, as Geohaghon confronted his detractors following a 3–1 defeat at Accrington Stanley's Crown Ground, with his manager leaving the stadium in secret for his own safety. Though Gannon was unpopular with players and fans, fan favourites and star players Gary Roberts and Marc Richards did stand by Geohaghon, calling the abuse he received "unfair... terrible... not acceptable" and "harsh". Two days later Gannon was sacked. Meanwhile, Geohaghon sought legal advice and claimed his scuffle with supporters came about after he reacted to racial abuse levelled at him by a number of fans. Unable to return to Peterborough by the terms of his loan, and unwilling to return to Vale Park, Geohaghon instead remained at his Birmingham home whilst the Football Association's investigation of racial abuse continued. The FA found that there was racist chanting from at least one Vale supporter.

Later career
In August 2011, Geohaghon left Peterborough United by mutual consent. Later that month Geohaghon signed a one-month contract with Barnet following a successful trial period. He played four games in ten days, before leaving the club. In October 2011, he signed with Conference Premier club Darlington, leaving him working with manager Mark Cooper for a third time. He made his debut for the club in a 4–3 win over Stockport County, and four days later he set up Jonathan Sanchez-Munoz for the only goal of a 1–0 win at home to Kidderminster Harriers. Despite this, Cooper was sacked on 25 October. On 21 November, Geohaghon returned to League Two football, signing a three-month loan deal with Dagenham & Redbridge. He made his debut at Victoria Park on 12 December, setting up Brian Woodall for the opening goal of a 2–1 defeat to former club Port Vale. Meanwhile, his parent club Darlington were suffering financial difficulties and Geohaghon's contract was terminated on 16 January 2012, along with the rest of the playing squad and caretaker manager Craig Liddle. Darlington held onto his registration, and on 24 February he signed for Conference Premier rivals Mansfield Town on loan until the rest of the season. He scored his first goal in nearly eighteen months on 13 March, when he headed in a stoppage time equalizer in a 1–1 draw with Conference Premier leaders Fleetwood Town at Field Mill. The "Stags" reached the play-offs, but crashed out at the semi-final stage to York City 2–1 on aggregate, with Geohaghon scoring an own goal in the first leg at Bootham Crescent after a communication breakdown with goalkeeper Alan Marriott.

In July 2012, Geohaghon joined Conference Premier side Kidderminster Harriers on a one-year deal. He had previously played under assistant boss Gary Whild during his time at Redditch. However, he re-signed with Mansfield Town on a permanent basis for a £5,000 transfer fee on 31 August, after less than two months at Aggborough; Geohaghon said he had "unfinished business" after Paul Cox's side lost at the play-off semi-final stage the previous season. His long-throws were a crucial part of the club's success in the early part of the 2012–13 season. Mansfield won promotion into the English Football League as Conference Premier champions in 2012–13, though Geoghaghon was not retained beyond the summer as he lost his first team place in the second half of the season.

He joined Conference North side Worcester City in September 2013. However, his spell lasted just five weeks as he was released after refusing to play in the FA Cup so as not to find himself cup-tied. In November 2013 he signed for Braintree Town. He played three games for the "Iron" before he dropped back into the Conference North to play for Marcus Bignot's Solihull Moors. In August 2014, he joined Nuneaton Town, making his debut in the club's 2–0 away defeat at Braintree on 22 August. Manager Brian Reid stated that "He brings a great deal of experience, is a great size, a leader and a good talker on the park. He also gives us an extra weapon with his long throw, which can be even better than a corner". He left the club the following month after making eight appearances.

Geohaghon played for Whitehawk in the Conference South against Basingstoke Town on 7 October 2014. Later in the year, he signed for Stourbridge of the Northern Premier League Premier Division. After leaving Stourbridge he took up boxing, and took part in two white-collar fights. He signed with National League side Torquay United in July 2015 after impressing manager Paul Cox while on trial at Plainmoor. At the start of the 2015–16 season, Geohaghon stated that he wanted to make Plainmoor "disgusting" for opposition teams to play against. He went on to feature in 18 league games as Torquay posted an 18th-place finish, three points above the relegation zone, and was not offered a contract by new manager Kevin Nicholson. In November 2016, that Geohaghon re-joined Nuneaton Town as a player-coach. He started the 2017–18 season at Stafford Rangers. He left Marston Road for a third spell with Nuneaton Town, with manager Tommy Wright saying "he feels that he has unfinished business here". However he joined Halesowen Town in December 2017. He started the 2018–19 season at Southern League Premier Division Central side Barwell, before joining Midland League Premier Division side Highgate United in December 2018. In December 2019, Geohaghon joined Gresley in the Midland League Premier Division and played seven games for the "Moatmen" before he left the club again at the end of February 2020.

International career
In November 2008, Geohaghon was called into the England C squad by Paul Fairclough for the match against Italy. The game ended in a 2–2 draw, with Geohaghon playing the full game. He also played in a 1–0 defeat against Belgium in May 2009, which was his final game for the team because of age restrictions. Both of these games were part of the 2007–09 International Challenge Trophy.

Style of play
He is known for his long-throwing ability. His  frame also gives him a natural advantage in the air, as well as great ball winning strength.

Career statistics

Notes
Complete statistics at Sutton Coldfield Town, Stourbridge, Nuneaton Town, Stafford Rangers, Halesowen Town, and Highgate United are unavailable.

References

1985 births
Living people
Footballers from Birmingham, West Midlands
Black British sportspeople
English footballers
England semi-pro international footballers
Association football defenders
West Bromwich Albion F.C. players
Sutton Coldfield Town F.C. players
Bromsgrove Rovers F.C. players
Redditch United F.C. players
Kettering Town F.C. players
Peterborough United F.C. players
Rotherham United F.C. players
Shrewsbury Town F.C. players
Port Vale F.C. players
Barnet F.C. players
Darlington F.C. players
Dagenham & Redbridge F.C. players
Mansfield Town F.C. players
Kidderminster Harriers F.C. players
Worcester City F.C. players
Braintree Town F.C. players
Solihull Moors F.C. players
Nuneaton Borough F.C. players
Whitehawk F.C. players
Stourbridge F.C. players
Torquay United F.C. players
Stafford Rangers F.C. players
Halesowen Town F.C. players
Barwell F.C. players
Highgate United F.C. players
Gresley F.C. players
Southern Football League players
English Football League players
National League (English football) players
Northern Premier League players
Midland Football Alliance players
Association football coaches
Alumni of the University of Wolverhampton